Fabre station is a Montreal Metro station in Montreal, Quebec, Canada. It is operated by the Société de transport de Montréal (STM) and served by the Blue Line. It is located in the Villeray neighbourhood.

Overview 

It is a normal side platform station with two entrances: one on rue Fabre and another on avenue Papineau. The brightly coloured murals and continuous handrail were designed by artist Jean-Noël Poliquin.

Origin of name
Fabre is named for the nearby rue Fabre. The street name honours Monseigneur Édouard-Charles Fabre (1827–1896), Montreal's first archbishop (1886).

Restoration of Jean-Noël Poliquin’s artwork
Restoration work for the artwork is underway at Fabre, to keep its architectural integrity at the station, with the walls becoming completely white during restoration, once the work is completed, the walls will go back to normal.

Connecting bus routes

References

Entrances

1737 Rue Jean Talon (at the corner of Jean Talon Street and Papineau Avenue)

1480 Rue Jean Talon (at the corner of Jean Talon Street and Fabre Street)

Nearby points of interest

 Hôpital Jean-Talon
 Parc Villeray

External links

Fabre station on STM website
Montreal by Metro, metrodemontreal.com
 2011 STM System Map
 Metro Map

Blue Line (Montreal Metro)
Rosemont–La Petite-Patrie
Railway stations in Canada opened in 1986
Villeray–Saint-Michel–Parc-Extension